Cristián Andrés Labbé Martínez (born 6 March 1980) is a Chilean politician who currently serves as a member of the Chamber of Deputies of Chile.

In 2013, Labbé was a member of the sequel of the reality show, Mundos Opuestos.

In 2021, he formed part of the Human Rights Commission of the Chamber of Deputies.

References

External links
 
 BCN Profile

1980 births
Living people
Gabriela Mistral University alumni
Major University alumni
University of the Americas (Chile) alumni
Independent Democratic Union politicians
21st-century Chilean politicians
People from Santiago